Aenictus is a large army ant genus distributed in the Old World tropics and subtropics. It contains about 181 species, making it one of the larger ant genera of the world.

Biology and distribution
The genus presently has 181 species, distributed through the East Mediterranean, Afrotropical, Oriental, Indo-Australian, and Australian regions. Most of the species are tropical, with terrestrial habitats, foraging in soil, leaf litter, most of the Southeast Asian species forage on the ground, and some on trees and hunting other ant species and termites.

Most species of the genus are specialized predators of other ants, especially of immature stages. Only some Asian species such as Aenictus gracilis, Aenictus laeviceps, Aenictus hodgsoni, and Aenictus paradentatus are known to hunt a variety of invertebrate prey, including ants, using a large number of workers in raids. Foraging raids undertaken by these ants occur both day and night, usually across the ground surface but occasionally also in trees. During raids, numerous workers attack ant nests in a small area, with several workers coordinating their efforts to carry large prey items back to the nest or bivouac. Species of Aenictus are generally small, monomorphic and yellow to dark brown.

Species

Aenictus acerbus Shattuck, 2008
Aenictus aitkenii Forel, 1901
Aenictus alluaudi Santschi, 1910
Aenictus alticola Wheeler, 1930
Aenictus ambiguus Shuckard, 1840
Aenictus anceps Forel, 1910
Aenictus annae Forel, 1911
Aenictus appressipilosus Jaitrong & Yamane, 2013
Aenictus arabicus Sharaf & Aldawood, 2012
Aenictus aratus Forel, 1900
Aenictus artipus Wilson, 1964
Aenictus arya Forel, 1901
Aenictus asantei Campione, Novak & Gotwald, 1983
Aenictus asperivalvus Santschi, 1919
Aenictus bakeri Menozzi, 1925
Aenictus baliensis Jaitrong & Yamane, 2013
Aenictus bayoni Menozzi, 1932
Aenictus binghami Forel, 1900
Aenictus biroi Forel, 1907
Aenictus bobaiensis Zhou & Chen, 1999
Aenictus bodongjaya Jaitrong & Yamane, 2011
Aenictus bottegoi Emery, 1899
Aenictus brazzai Santschi, 1910
Aenictus breviceps Forel, 1912
Aenictus brevicornis (Mayr, 1879)
Aenictus brevinodus Jaitrong & Yamane, 2011
Aenictus brevipodus Jaitrong & Yamane, 2013
Aenictus buttelreepeni Forel, 1913
Aenictus buttgenbachi Forel, 1913
Aenictus camposi Wheeler & Chapman, 1925
Aenictus carolianus Zettel & Sorger, 2010
Aenictus certus Westwood, 1842
Aenictus ceylonicus (Mayr, 1866)
Aenictus changmaianus Terayama & Kubota, 1993
Aenictus chapmani Wilson, 1964
Aenictus clavatus Forel, 1901
Aenictus clavitibia Forel, 1901
Aenictus concavus Jaitrong & Yamane, 2013
Aenictus congolensis Santschi, 1911
Aenictus cornutus Forel, 1900
Aenictus crucifer Santschi, 1914
Aenictus currax Emery, 1900
Aenictus cylindripetiolus Jaitrong & Yamane, 2013
Aenictus decolor (Mayr, 1879)
Aenictus dentatus Forel, 1911
Aenictus diclops Shattuck, 2008
Aenictus dlusskyi Arnol'di, 1968
Aenictus doryloides Wilson, 1964
Aenictus doydeei Jaitrong, Yamane & Chanthalangsy, 2011
Aenictus duengkaei Jaitrong & Yamane, 2012
Aenictus eguchii Jaitrong & Yamane, 2013
Aenictus eugenii Emery, 1895
Aenictus exilis Wilson, 1964
Aenictus feae Emery, 1889
Aenictus fergusoni Forel, 1901
Aenictus foreli Santschi, 1919
Aenictus formosensis Forel, 1913
Aenictus fuchuanensis Zhou, 2001
Aenictus fulvus Jaitrong & Yamane, 2011
Aenictus furculatus Santschi, 1919
Aenictus furibundus Arnold, 1959
Aenictus fuscipennis Forel, 1913
Aenictus fuscovarius Gerstäcker, 1859
Aenictus gibbosus Dalla Torre, 1893
Aenictus glabratus Jaitrong & Nur-Zati, 2010
Aenictus glabrinotum Jaitrong & Yamane, 2011
Aenictus gleadowii Forel, 1901
Aenictus gonioccipus Jaitrong & Yamane, 2013
Aenictus gracilis Emery, 1893
Aenictus grandis Bingham, 1903
Aenictus gutianshanensis Staab, 2014
Aenictus hamifer Emery, 1896
Aenictus henanensis Li & Wang, 2005
Aenictus hilli Clark, 1928
Aenictus hodgsoni Forel, 1901
Aenictus hottai Terayama & Yamane, 1989
Aenictus humeralis Santschi, 1910
Aenictus huonicus Wilson, 1964
Aenictus icarus Forel, 1911
Aenictus idoneus Menozzi, 1928
Aenictus inconspicuus Westwood, 1845
Aenictus indicus Bharti, Wachkoo & Kumar, 2012
Aenictus inflatus Yamane & Hashimoto, 1999
Aenictus itoi Jaitrong & Yamane, 2013
Aenictus jacobsoni Forel, 1909
Aenictus jarujini Jaitrong & Yamane, 2010
Aenictus javanus Emery, 1896
Aenictus jawadwipa Jaitrong & Yamane, 2013
Aenictus khaoyaiensis Jaitrong & Yamane, 2013
Aenictus kutai Jaitrong & Wiwatwitaya, 2013
Aenictus laeviceps (Smith, 1857)
Aenictus latifemoratus Terayama & Yamane, 1989
Aenictus latiscapus Forel, 1901
Aenictus leliepvrei Bernard, 1953
Aenictus leptotyphlatta Jaitrong & Eguchi, 2010
Aenictus levior (Karavaiev, 1926)
Aenictus lifuiae Terayama, 1984
Aenictus longi Forel, 1901
Aenictus longicephalus Jaitrong & Yamane, 2013
Aenictus longinodus Jaitrong & Yamane, 2012
Aenictus luteus Emery, 1892
Aenictus luzoni Wheeler & Chapman, 1925
Aenictus maneerati Jaitrong & Yamane, 2013
Aenictus mariae Emery, 1895
Aenictus mauritanicus Santschi, 1910
Aenictus mentu Weber, 1942
Aenictus minimus Jaitrong & Hashimoto, 2012
Aenictus minipetiolus Jaitrong & Yamane, 2013
Aenictus minutulus Terayama & Yamane, 1989
Aenictus mocsaryi Emery, 1901
Aenictus moebii Emery, 1895
Aenictus montivagus Jaitrong & Yamane, 2011
Aenictus mutatus Santschi, 1913
Aenictus nesiotis Wheeler, 1930
Aenictus nganduensis Wilson, 1964
Aenictus nishimurai Terayama & Kubota, 1993
Aenictus obscurus Smith, 1865
Aenictus orientalis (Karavaiev, 1926)
Aenictus pachycerus (Smith, 1858)
Aenictus pangantihoni Zettel & Sorger, 2010
Aenictus paradentatus Jaitrong, Yamane & Tasen, 2012
Aenictus parahuonicus Jaitrong & Yamane, 2011
Aenictus peguensis Emery, 1895
Aenictus pfeifferi Zettel & Sorger, 2010
Aenictus pharoa Santschi, 1924
Aenictus philiporum Wilson, 1964
Aenictus philippinensis Chapman, 1963
Aenictus piercei Wheeler, 1930
Aenictus pilosus Jaitrong & Yamane, 2013
Aenictus pinkaewi Jaitrong & Yamane, 2013
Aenictus porizonoides Walker, 1860
Aenictus powersi Wheeler, 1930
Aenictus prolixus Shattuck, 2008
Aenictus pubescens Smith, 1859
Aenictus punctatus Jaitrong & Yamane, 2012
Aenictus punctiventris Emery, 1901
Aenictus punensis Forel, 1901
Aenictus rabori Chapman, 1963
Aenictus raptor Forel, 1913
Aenictus reyesi Chapman, 1963
Aenictus rhodiensis Menozzi, 1936
Aenictus rixator Emery, 1901
Aenictus rotundatus Mayr, 1901
Aenictus rotundicollis Jaitrong & Yamane, 2011
Aenictus rougieri André, 1893
Aenictus sagei Forel, 1901
Aenictus schneirlai Wilson, 1964
Aenictus shillongensis Mathew & Tiwari, 2000
Aenictus shuckardi Forel, 1901
Aenictus siamensis Jaitrong & Yamane, 2011
Aenictus silvestrii Wheeler, 1929
Aenictus sonchaengi Jaitrong & Yamane, 2011
Aenictus soudanicus Santschi, 1910
Aenictus spathifer Santschi, 1928
Aenictus steindachneri Mayr, 1901
Aenictus stenocephalus Jaitrong, Yamane & Wiwatwitaya, 2010
Aenictus subterraneus Jaitrong & Hashimoto, 2012
Aenictus sulawesiensis Jaitrong & Wiwatwitaya, 2013
Aenictus sumatrensis Forel, 1913
Aenictus sundalandensis Jaitrong & Yamane, 2013
Aenictus thailandianus Terayama & Kubota, 1993
Aenictus togoensis Santschi, 1915
Aenictus trigonus Forel, 1911
Aenictus turneri Forel, 1900
Aenictus vagans Santschi, 1924
Aenictus vaucheri Emery, 1915
Aenictus vieti Jaitrong, Yamane & Wiwatwitaya, 2010
Aenictus villiersi Bernard, 1953
Aenictus watanasiti Jaitrong & Yamane, 2013
Aenictus wayani Jaitrong & Yamane, 2011
Aenictus weissi Santschi, 1910
Aenictus westwoodi Forel, 1901
Aenictus wilaiae Jaitrong & Yamane, 2013
Aenictus wilsoni Bharti, Wachkoo & Kumar, 2012
Aenictus wiwatwitayai Jaitrong & Yamane, 2013
Aenictus wroughtonii Forel, 1890
Aenictus wudangshanensis Wang, 2006
Aenictus yamanei Wiwatwitaya & Jaitrong, 2011
Aenictus zhengi Zhang, 1995

References

External links

Dorylinae
Ant genera
Taxa named by William Edward Shuckard